Diogo Maria de Sousa Franco de Matos (born 15 November 1975), known simply as Diogo, is a Portuguese retired footballer who played as a defensive midfielder.

Club career
Born in Lisbon, Diogo finished his football formation with local Sporting Clube de Portugal, but left the club at the age of 18, making his professional debuts with F.C. Alverca in the third division. In the 1995 summer he moved to Académica de Coimbra in the second level and, one year later, returned to Alverca who now was in the same tier, promoting to the Primeira Liga at the end of his second season.

From 1999 to 2001, Diogo appeared in 48 top division games (44 starts) and scored three goals, helping Alverca finish in midtable on both occasions. He was then rebought by Sporting, but was nothing more than a fringe player for the Laszlo Bölöni-led side, who went on to win the 2002 national championship; during his contract, he was also loaned to UD Las Palmas in Spain and former club Alverca, and retired from football in June 2004, aged only 28.

International career
Diogo played all the matches but one for the Portugal under-20 team that finished third in the 1995 FIFA World Youth Championship, held in Qatar.

Honours
Primeira Liga: 2001–02
Taça de Portugal: 2001–02

References

External links

1975 births
Living people
Footballers from Lisbon
Portuguese footballers
Association football midfielders
Primeira Liga players
Liga Portugal 2 players
Segunda Divisão players
Sporting CP footballers
F.C. Alverca players
Associação Académica de Coimbra – O.A.F. players
Sporting CP B players
Segunda División players
UD Las Palmas players
Portugal youth international footballers
Portuguese expatriate footballers
Expatriate footballers in Spain
Portuguese expatriate sportspeople in Spain